Kitagawa (written: 北川 or 喜多川) is a Japanese surname. Notable people with the surname include:

Asami Kitagawa, Olympic swimmer
Fuyuhiko Kitagawa, poet and film critic
Ichitarō Kitagawa, famous woodblock artist and painter who later changed his name to Yusuke and Utamaro
Issei Kitagawa, politician
Johnny (Hiromu) Kitagawa (1931–2019), boy band promoter
Joseph Kitagawa, historian of religions, dean of University of Chicago Divinity School in the 1970s
Katsutoshi Kitagawa, lyricist, see Aria, worked with Rieko Itou.
Kazuo Kitagawa, cabinet minister of forestry in Japan
Keiichi Kitagawa, biker
Keiko Kitagawa, actress/model
, Japanese footballer
Mary Kitagawa, Canadian educator 
Masao Kitagawa (1910–1995), botanist
Miyuki Kitagawa, manga writer, such as Ano Ko ni 1000%
Rio Kitagawa, singer and member of the j-pop group Morning Musume
Sho Kitagawa, manga writer for Hotman and C (manga) who inspired Itaru Hinoue
Susumu Kitagawa (born 1951), Japanese chemist
Takurō Kitagawa, voice actor of Sigma Seven
Tomokatsu Kitagawa, politician
Tsutomu Kitagawa, actor and stunt man
Yonehiko Kitagawa, voice actor
Yoshio Kitagawa, football player
Yuuko Kitagawa, a manga author

Fictional characters
Jun Kitagawa (Kanon) from Kanon
Kenta Kitagawa from Digimon Frontier
Mai Kitagawa from World Trigger
Marin Kitagawa from My Dress-Up Darling
Yusuke Kitagawa from Persona 5

See also
Kitagawa, Kōchi prefecture
Kitagawa, Miyazaki prefecture
Tosa-Kitagawa Station

Japanese-language surnames